Khalaji is an Iranian surname. Notable people with the surname include:

 Mehdi Khalaji (born 1973), Iranian-American writer, scholar of Islamic studies, and political analyst
 Mohammad-Taghi Khalaji (born 1948), Iranian Shia cleric

Iranian-language surnames